Indu Sharma International Katha Samman is a literary award given by the Indu Sharma Memorial Trust. Chitra Mudgal received the first Katha Samman. The award was instituted in memory of poet and short story writer Indu Sharma. She died of cancer in 1995.

Awardees

References

External links 
 Official page

Indian literary awards
Awards established in 2000
2000 establishments in India
Fiction awards